Frettenham is a village and civil parish in the English county of Norfolk.

History
Frettenham's name is of Anglo-Saxon origin and derives from the Old English for Fraeta's homestead or village.

In the Domesday Book, Frettenham is listed as a settlement of 34 households hundred of Taverham. In 1086, the village was part of the East Anglian estates of Roger the Poitevin.

Frettenham Windmill dates from the late-Nineteenth Century and is currently a private residence with its sails and fantail removed. The windmill is a Grade II listed building.

Geography
According to the 2011 Census, Frettenham has a population of 740 residents living in 321 households.

Frettenham falls within the constituency of Broadland and is represented at Parliament by Jerome Mayhew MP of the Conservative Party. For the purposes of local government, the parish falls within the district of Broadland.

Hillside Animal Sanctuary is located within the parish.

St. Swithin's Church
Frettenham's parish church is dedicated to Saint Swithin and dates from the late-Medieval period with substantial Nineteenth Century restoration. The church also holds a monumental brass memorial to Alice Thorndon (d.1420) with further stone memorials to Rev. Richard Woodes (d.1620) and Thomas Drake (d.1810) who was a treasurer aboard HMS Centaur and later a prisoner of Hyder Ali and Tipu Sultan.

War Memorial
Frettenham's war memorial takes the form of a stone obelisk above a trapezoid plinth and is located in St. Swithun's Cemetery. The memorial lists the following names for the First World War:

 Sgt. Thomas C. Buck DCM (d.1915), 2nd Bn., Coldstream Guards
 L-Cpl. Louis P. Money (1897-1918), 1/7th Bn., Lancashire Fusiliers
 L-Cpl. Albert Rivett MM (1891-1918), 9th Bn., Royal Norfolk Regiment
 Dvr. Walter J. Forster (1885-1918), 27th Bde., Royal Field Artillery
 Gnr. Frederick J. Stoladay (1889-1918), 46th Bde., Royal Field Artillery
 Pvt. Charles A. Buck (d.1917), 1st Bn., Essex Regiment
 Pvt. Frederick C. Muskett (1897-1917), 1st Bn., Royal Norfolk Regt.
 Pvt. Frederick H. Bloom (d.1915), 7th Bn., Royal Norfolk Regt.
 Pvt. William F. Norgate (1891-1917), 1/5th Bn., Northumberland Fusiliers
 Rfn. Robert C. Garrett (1889-1917), 1/9th (Queen Victoria's Rifles) Bn., London Regiment

And, the following for the Second World War:
 Pvt. Sydney G. Wymer (1923-1944), 1/4th Bn., Essex Regt.
 Pvt. Cecil G. Cannell (1917-1943), 6th Bn., Royal Norfolk Regt.
 A. Cousins

References

External links

Villages in Norfolk
Civil parishes in Norfolk
Broadland